Trà Cú is a rural district (huyện) of Trà Vinh province in the Mekong Delta region of Vietnam. As of 2003, the district had a population of 167,637. The district covers an area of 368 km². The district capital is Trà Cú.

References

Districts of Trà Vinh province